Valsta is a suburban area in the vicinity of Märsta, north of Stockholm, Sweden.

Populated places in Stockholm County